Amigny-Rouy is a commune in the department of Aisne in the Hauts-de-France region of northern France.

Geography
Amigny-Rouy is located some 30 km south of Saint Quentin and 25 km west by northwest of Laon.  The commune is accessed by road D7 from Sinceny in the west passing through the heart of the commune and continuing east to Saint-Gobain.  The D53 road comes from Condren in the northwest passing through the village and continuing south to Barisis.  There is also a network of country roads throughout the commune. Most of the commune is farmland; however, there is a large forested area in the south forming part of an extensive forested area outside the commune. There are no other hamlets or villages in the commune.

The Oise river forms the northern and northwestern border of the commune and the Ruisseau de Servais with numerous tributaries passes from east to west through the northern portion of the commune into the Oise. The Ru de Greve flows through the south of the commune. There are also a number of small lakes in the commune.

Neighbouring communes and villages

Heraldry

Administration
List of Successive Mayors of Amigny-Rouy

Mayors from 1935

Population

Religious heritage
The Parish Church contains a Stained glass window: Christ on the Cross (16th century)which is registered as an historical object.

Notable people linked to the commune
Gédéon Poizot, Lieutenant French Forces of the Interior (FFI), (born 26 June 1907 Amigny-Rouy - died 10 August 1944, at the edge of the Busigny woods), alias "Poulain-Germain," hero and martyr of the Resistance (Maquis Mazinghem), killed on 10 August 1944 by the Vichy Milice.
Elysee Darthenay Alban, born 3 January 1913 in Montrouge, a graduate of the Lyautey Class from Saint-Cyr and became a lieutenant in the 4th RIM of Auxerre. He was under instruction with his Battalion at Amigny-Rouy from 23 October 1939 to 10 May 1940. He married in Nuits-Saint-Georges on 3 January 1940 and his wife joined him in hiding from the military authorities in Amigny-Rouy. He was cited on the order of the Division and received the Croix de Guerre for his bravery in combat defending the Haubourdin (Lille) bridges from 28 to 31 May 1940. As a prisoner at Hoyeverda he failed twice to escape and was transferred to the disciplinary prison of Colditz from where he escaped on 6 July 1943. In December 1943 he made himself available to the Resistance in Lyon and was assigned to the FFI of Bourg-en-Bresse in January 1944. In early February 1944 he was head of the Maquis in the Secret Army of Jura. Arrested on 7 April 1944 by the Gestapo, he was tortured until 11 April but did not speak. His silence saved 800 Maquis including Colonel Romans-Petit, leader of the Secret Army of Ain and Savoie. He left two orphans. On 26 April 1945 General de Gaulle made him a chevalier of the Legion of Honour. In 1974 a class in Saint-Cyr was named after him, a hero the Resistance 1939–1945, who had only five months of family life which he spent illegally in Amigny-Rouy.

Sports Associations
Football club

See also
Communes of the Aisne department

References

External links
Amigny-Rouy on the old National Geographic Institute website 
Amigny-Rouy official website 
40000 Bell Towers website 
Amigny-Rouy on Géoportail, National Geographic Institute (IGN) website 
Rouy and Amigny'' on the 1750 Cassini Map

Communes of Aisne